Moose Lake Township is a township in Cass County, Minnesota, United States. The population was 142 as of the 2000 census.

Geography
According to the United States Census Bureau, the township has a total area of 38.7 square miles (100.3 km), of which 37.5 square miles (97.1 km) is land and 1.2 square miles (3.1 km) (3.13%) is water.

Unincorporated communities
 Graff

Lakes
 Camp Two Lake
 Crooked Lake
 Deer Lake
 Fox Meadow Lake
 Grade Lake
 Hardwood Lake
 Horseshoe Lake
 Kelly Lake
 Long Lake
 Lova Lake
 Milford Lake
 Minnie Lake
 Moore Lake
 Moose Lake
 Rat Lake
 Rob Lake (vast majority)
 Rock Lake
 Round Lake
 Section Thirtysix Lake (northwest half)
 Seven Lakes

Adjacent townships
 Bungo Township (north)
 Walden Township (northeast)
 Maple Township (east)
 Home Brook Township (southeast)
 Meadow Brook Township (south)
 Byron Township (southwest)
 Poplar Township (west)

Cemeteries
The township contains Moose Lake Cemetery.

Demographics
As of the census of 2000, there were 142 people, 49 households, and 39 families residing in the township. The population density was 3.8 people per square mile (1.5/km). There were 61 housing units at an average density of 1.6/sq mi (0.6/km). The racial makeup of the township was 95.77% White, 2.11% Native American, and 2.11% from two or more races. Hispanic or Latino of any race were 0.70% of the population.

There were 49 households, out of which 38.8% had children under the age of 18 living with them, 63.3% were married couples living together, 8.2% had a female householder with no husband present, and 18.4% were non-families. 18.4% of all households were made up of individuals, and 8.2% had someone living alone who was 65 years of age or older. The average household size was 2.90 and the average family size was 3.18.

In the township the population was spread out, with 28.9% under the age of 18, 12.7% from 18 to 24, 23.9% from 25 to 44, 24.6% from 45 to 64, and 9.9% who were 65 years of age or older. The median age was 35 years. For every 100 females, there were 121.9 males. For every 100 females age 18 and over, there were 129.5 males.

The median income for a household in the township was $43,333, and the median income for a family was $49,583. Males had a median income of $33,750 versus $18,438 for females. The per capita income for the township was $15,687. There were 13.5% of families and 22.3% of the population living below the poverty line, including 30.8% of under eighteens and 36.4% of those over 64.

Pop culture reference
 Moose Lake was depicted in the 1996 film Fargo, in which the kidnappers hide out in a cabin on the lake. The scene was actually filmed on Square Lake in Stillwater.

References
 United States National Atlas
 United States Census Bureau 2007 TIGER/Line Shapefiles
 United States Board on Geographic Names (GNIS)

Townships in Cass County, Minnesota
Brainerd, Minnesota micropolitan area
Townships in Minnesota